Track the Man Down is a 1955 British drama film directed by R. G. Springsteen, and starring Kent Taylor, Petula Clark, and George Rose.
 
The melodramatic crime caper centers on a robbery at a greyhound racetrack that results in the unintentional murder of a guard. The perpetrator leaves the loot with his girl friend, commandeers a motorcoach bound for Southampton, and holds hostage its diverse array of passengers, including an American newspaper reporter and the girl friend's resourceful sister.

The film, the second made by Republic Pictures' British production company, makes good use of London's Victoria Station and locations along the banks of the River Thames. It was made at Walton Studios with sets designed by the art director John Stoll.

Cast
 Kent Taylor as John Ford
 Petula Clark as June Dennis
 George Rose as Rick Lambert
 Kenneth Griffith as Ken Orwell
 Ursula Howells as Mary Dennis
 Walter Rilla as Austin Melford
 Renée Houston as Pat Sherwood
 Lloyd Lamble as Inspector Barnett
 Richard Molinas as Luis Remino

References

Bibliography
  Len D. Martin. The Republic Pictures Checklist: Features, Serials, Cartoons, Short Subjects and Training Films of Republic Pictures Corporation, 1935-1959. McFarland, 1998.

External links

 

1955 films
British crime drama films
1955 crime drama films
Republic Pictures films
Films directed by R. G. Springsteen
Films shot at Nettlefold Studios
Films shot in London
Films set in London
1950s English-language films
1950s British films
British black-and-white films